The Devonsville Terror is a 1983 American supernatural horror film directed by Ulli Lommel and starring Suzanna Love, Donald Pleasence, and Robert Walker. The plot focuses on three different women who arrive in a conservative New England town, one of whom is the reincarnation of a witch who was wrongfully executed along with two others (Morrigan Hurt and Barbara Cihlar) by the town's founding fathers in 1683.

Inspired by the Salem Witch Trials, writer-director Lommel and his wife, actress Suzanna Love, co-wrote the screenplay for The Devonsville Terror with George T. Lindsey. The film was shot in Lincoln County, Wisconsin in 1983, and was intended for a theatrical release but instead was released directly to home video in October 1983 through Embassy Home Entertainment. Anchor Bay Entertainment reissued the film in 1999 on both VHS as well as a double billing DVD paired with Lommel's The Boogeyman (1980). In 2016, a new edition was released on Blu-ray and DVD through the UK distributor 88 Films.

The film has been noted by some film scholars as an early example of a feminist-inspired horror film.

Plot
On November 7, 1683 in Devonsville, Massachusetts, three womenJessica Morley, Mary Pratt, and Rebecca Carsonare kidnapped by the townsfolk based on accusations of witchcraft. Jessica is disemboweled by hogs, and Mary is killed with a breaking wheel. Rebecca, the last to die, is burned at the stake. After Rebecca's execution, her apparition appears in the sky and a thunderstorm begins.

300 years later, Devonsville remains a small, conservative farming community far from major cities. The killing of the three women as witches has become known as the Devonsville Inquisition. The local town doctor, Dr. Warley, is investigating the witches' purported curse on Devonsville; he also finds himself plagued by a bizarre illness in which worms crawl from his skin, an apparent curse linked to his ancestors' involvement in the inquisition. Meanwhile, three liberated, assertive women move to the town: Jenny Scanlon, the new schoolteacher; Chris, an environmental scientist; and Monica, a radio disc jockey. Their presence angers the town's bigoted patriarchs, among them Walter Gibbs, a middle-aged store owner who has recently murdered his sick wife, Sarah. While a medical examination shows that Sarah was killed rather than dying of natural causes, Dr. Warley provides a death certificate certifying natural causes so Walter can collect the insurance payout. Upon Jenny's arrival in town, she is greeted by brothers Ralph and Matthew Pendleton, both of whom are friendly. Later that night in his store, Walter witnesses an apparition of a nude Jenny. Ralph Pendleton meets with Dr. Warley during an annual medical visit who uses hypnosis on Matthew to examine Ralph's links to the inquisition. Ralph states that his ancestor accused Jessica of witchcraft for spurning his sexual advances.

Jenny infuriates the local parents when she tells her class that God was considered a female in Babylonian times, and that God's representation as a father figure was introduced with Judaism. Chris is investigating the water quality at a local lake that the town's sewage dumps into. This causes the townspeople to fear that she will claim they are destroying the local environment. Monica hosts a radio call-in show where she often gives advice to female callers inquiring about relationship problems. This angers several men in the town who believe Monica is subverting their authority and corrupting local women with progressive ideas. Walter becomes romantically obsessed with Jenny, but she turns down his advances at his store one night. He then has a nightmare in which Jenny reveals to him that she knows that he murdered Sarah, before drowning him in a bog. Jenny visits Dr. Warley for her insomnia, and Warley suspects Jenny is one of the three witches reincarnated. Under hypnosis, Jenny states she is not a witch but actually a "messenger from the unknown."

Convinced that Jenny, Chris, and Monica are the witches reincarnated, Walter persuades Matthew and others kidnap each of the women one night. Chris is taken into the woods, bound, and killed by hunting dogs mirroring the death of Jessica. Monica is taken from her radio station and dragged behind a truck mirroring the death of Mary. Jenny is kidnapped from her home and bound to a stake. The group recreates the Devonsville Inquisition and threatens to burn Jenny like Rebecca. However, Jenny unleashes her power, kills them all violently with witchcraft, and releases herself from her bindings. The next morning, Jenny boards a bus leaving Devonsville. A postscript intertitle from Dr. Warley's journal states that the curse has been lifted, and the Devonsville terror is over.

Cast

Analysis
Film scholar Heather Greene interprets The Devonsville Terror as a feminist-inspired horror film that uses the "accused woman construction" in which a woman accused of mal-intended witchcraft returns to seek vengeance, similar to The Crucible and Three Sovereigns for Sarah, reflecting a "certain trend toward expressing a feminist ethos." She adds: "Though not a polished film, The Devonsville Terror offers a loosely constructed commentary on contemporary gender politics. The male characters want to rid themselves of the progressive women. They are portrayed as murderous, lecherous, and gang-like, and are often showed gathering around a dinner table discussing their plans...  Unlike most horror witch films, [in The Devonsville Terror] it is the men who are evil."

Production

Inspiration
The Devonsville Terror was written by Lommel and George T. Lindsey, and draws on numerous historical aspects of the witchcraft inquisition in the colonial era of the United States. Lommel stated that he had spent some time in Massachusetts and was inspired by the Salem Witch Trials. Star Suzanna Love, Lommel's wife, also helped write the film.

Filming
Filming took place in the fall of 1982 in Lincoln County, Wisconsin, in the city of Tomahawk, where a small local film studio was located. The historic Brickyard School in Merrill, Wisconsin, was also used as a filming location, and received a fresh coat of paint to its exterior funded by the production company. 

The film's special effects were created by makeup and effects artist Matthew Mungle.

Release
The Devonsville Terror was given theatrical marketing through Motion Picture Marketing company (MPM) in 1983, though it never made it into theaters. The film was mentioned in a lawsuit regarding CinAmerica Pictures, a production company who falsely claimed to have produced the film (along with several other films by Lommel, including The Boogeyman and Olivia), with net profits of $150,000; however, according to the film's actual production company, New West Films, The Devonsville Terror had no net profit.

Critical response

Brett H. from Oh the Horror criticized the film's lack of sense, dialogue, but ultimately stated that the film was "a bit of a mess, but it’s ultimately a very amusing mess."

Home media
Embassy Pictures released the film on VHS in October 1983. Anchor Bay Entertainment re-released the film on VHS in 1999, along with a double-billing DVD paired with Lommel's The Boogeyman (1980), which is out of print. The UK distributor 88 Films released new region-free Blu-ray and DVD editions of the film on December 26, 2016. Vinegar Syndrome released a new Blu-ray edition, made available through their online store on February 14, 2023, ahead of a wide release scheduled for March 28, 2023.

References

Sources

External links
 
 

1983 films
1983 horror films
American feminist films
American films about revenge
American independent films
American supernatural horror films
Films about curses
Films about witchcraft
Films set in Massachusetts
Films shot in Wisconsin
Folk horror films
Salem witch trials in fiction
1980s feminist films
1983 independent films
1980s English-language films
1980s American films